De sphaera mundi (Latin title meaning On the Sphere of the World, sometimes rendered The Sphere of the Cosmos; the Latin title is also given as Tractatus de sphaera, Textus de sphaera, or simply De sphaera) is a medieval introduction to the basic elements of astronomy written by Johannes de Sacrobosco (John of Holywood) c. 1230. Based heavily on Ptolemy's Almagest, and drawing additional ideas from Islamic astronomy, it was one of the most influential works of pre-Copernican astronomy in Europe.

Reception
Sacrobosco's De sphaera mundi was the most successful of several competing thirteenth-century textbooks on this topic. It was used in universities for hundreds of years and the manuscript copied many times before the invention of the printing press; hundreds of manuscript copies have survived. The first printed edition appeared in 1472 in Ferrara, and at least 84 editions were printed in the next two hundred years. The work was frequently supplemented with commentaries on the original text. The number of copies and commentaries reflects its importance as a university text.

Content
The 'sphere of the world' is not the earth but the heavens, and Sacrobosco quotes Theodosius saying it is a solid body. It is divided into nine parts: the "first moved" (primum mobile), the sphere of the fixed stars (the firmament), and the seven planets, Saturn, Jupiter, Mars, the sun, Venus, Mercury and the moon. There is a 'right' sphere and an oblique sphere: the right sphere is only observed by those at the equator (if there are such people), everyone else sees the oblique sphere. There are two movements: one of the heavens from east to west on its axis through the Arctic and Antarctic poles, the other of the inferior spheres at 23° in the opposite direction on their own axes.

The world, or universe, is divided into two parts: the elementary and the ethereal. The elementary consists of four parts: the earth, about which is water, then air, then fire, reaching up to the moon. Above this is the ethereal which is immutable and called the 'fifth essence' by the philosophers. All are mobile except heavy earth which is the center of the world.

The universe as a machine
Sacrobosco spoke of the universe as the machina mundi, the machine of the world, suggesting that the reported eclipse of the Sun at the crucifixion of Jesus was a disturbance of the order of that machine. This concept is similar to the clockwork universe analogy that became very popular centuries later, during the Enlightenment.

Spherical Earth

Though principally about the universe, De sphaera 1230 A.D. contains a clear description of the Earth as a sphere which agrees with widespread opinion in Europe during the higher Middle Ages, in contrast to statements of some 19th- and 20th-century historians that medieval scholars thought the Earth was flat. As evidence for the Earth being a sphere, in Chapter One he cites the observation that stars rise and set sooner for those in the east ("Orientals"), and lunar eclipses happen earlier; that stars near the North Pole are visible to those further north and those in the south can see different ones;  that at sea one can see further by climbing up the mast; and that water seeks its natural shape which is round, as a drop.

See also
Armillary sphere
Orrery

References

Sources

External links
 
 Summary of the contents of each chapter
 Sacrobosco's De Sphaera – complete treatise in English translation
 Book, The Sphere of Sacrobosco and its Commentators, by Lynn Thorndike, year 1949. Text in Latin, English translation, and commentary. 
 
 Selected images from Sphaera mundi From The College of Physicians of Philadelphia Digital Library

1230s books
Astronomy books
Astrological texts
13th-century Latin books
Treatises
pt:Johannes de Sacrobosco